Potassium voltage-gated channel subfamily D member 2 is a protein that in humans is encoded by the KCND2 gene. It contributes to the cardiac transient outward potassium current (Ito1), the main contributing current to the repolarizing phase 1 of the cardiac action potential.

Description
Voltage-gated potassium (Kv) channels represent the most complex class of voltage-gated ion channels from both functional and structural standpoints. Their diverse functions include regulating neurotransmitter release, heart rate, insulin secretion, neuronal excitability, epithelial electrolyte transport, smooth muscle contraction, and cell volume. Four sequence-related potassium channel genes - shaker, shaw, shab, and shal - have been identified in Drosophila, and each has been shown to have human homolog(s). This gene encodes a member of the potassium channel, voltage-gated, shal-related subfamily, members of which form voltage-activated A-type potassium ion channels and are prominent in the repolarization phase of the action potential. This member mediates a rapidly inactivating, A-type outward potassium current which is not under the control of the N terminus as it is in Shaker channels.

Interactions
KCND2 has been shown to interact with FLNC.

See also
 Voltage-gated potassium channel

References

Further reading

External links